Alastua Station (ATA) is a class II railway station located in Tlogomulyo, Pedurungan, Semarang. The station, which is located at an altitude of +6 m, is included in the Semarang Operation Area IV and is the station that is located at the easternmost location in the city of Semarang.

This station is a station located on the first railway line in Indonesia between  Station (NIS) and  Station. This station is usually a stop for trains from the east heading to the west, especially if  Station is flooded or the track is full or there is a severe traffic jam on Jl. Raya Kaligawe.

Services
The following is a list of train services at the Alastua Station.

Passenger services
 Commuter

References

External links

Buildings and structures in Semarang
Railway stations in Central Java
Railway stations opened in 1867